The 1944 Paris–Roubaix was the 42nd edition of the Paris–Roubaix, a classic one-day cycle race in France. The single day event was held on 9 April 1944 and stretched  from Paris to the finish at Roubaix Velodrome. The winner was Maurice Desimpelaere from Belgium.

Results

References

Paris–Roubaix
Paris–Roubaix
Paris–Roubaix
Paris–Roubaix